was a Japanese politician and the governor of Hiroshima Prefecture from 1993 to 2009. A native of Minami-ku, Hiroshima and graduate of Keio University, he had served in the House of Councillors in the Diet of Japan since 1989 for one term before being elected governor.

Governor of Hiroshima prefecture
As governor, he protested the US-Indian agreement on nuclear cooperation of September 2008. In 2006, he opposed, along with other governors in Japan, the US plan to rearrange the deployment of US troops in Japan. On July 16, 2009, he reversed the policy of Hiroshima prefecture regarding compensations to hibakusha living outside Japan as he announced that he would not appeal a July 2008 ruling of the District Court of Hiroshima regarding such compensations to a hibakusha who had emigrated to Brazil.

Notes

References 
 

1949 births
2015 deaths
People from Hiroshima
Governors of Hiroshima
Members of the House of Councillors (Japan)